José Pablo Feinmann (29 March 1943 – 17 December 2021) was an Argentine philosopher, writer, playwright, and television host. He also penned several screenplays for domestic film production and international coproductions.

Born to Abraham and Elena (de Albuquerque) Feinmann, Feinmann was a Peronist Youth militant during the 1970s, considering Peronism as a real mass movement with the potential to change the country for the better. Nevertheless, he opposed armed violence to achieve political ends, criticizing the foco theory of Che Guevara which, years after the Cuban Revolution, became popular in some sectors of the Marxist-Peronist movement, such as Montoneros. 

Feinmann abandoned Peronism in the 1990s, during the neoliberal government of Carlos Menem. He later became a supporter of left-wing Peronist president Cristina Fernandez.

Death
Feinmann died from complications of a stroke on 17 December 2021, at the age of 78.

Works

Novels 
 Últimos días de la víctima (1979)
El ejército de ceniza (1986)
 La Astucia de la Razón (1990)
 El cadáver imposible (1992)
 Los crímenes de Van Gogh (1994)
 La sombra de Heidegger (2005)
 Timote: secuestro y muerte del general Aramburu (2009)
 Carter en New York (2009)
 Carter en Vietnam (2009)

Screenplays 
 En retirada
 At the Edge of the Law
 Eva Perón: The True Story
 Ángel, la Diva y Yo
 El Amor y el Espanto
 Ay Juancito

TV 
 El cine por asalto (2007)
 Cine contexto (2008-2010)
 Filosofía, aquí y ahora (2009– ?)

References

External links 

 

1943 births
2021 deaths
Argentine essayists
Male essayists
Argentine people of German-Jewish descent
Argentine people of Brazilian descent
People of Brazilian-Jewish descent
Argentine male novelists
Argentine educators
Argentine philosophers
Argentine television personalities
Peronists
20th-century Argentine novelists
21st-century Argentine novelists
21st-century Argentine male writers
People from Buenos Aires